Mohinder Kaur Josh is an Indian politician from the state of Punjab. Daughter of Veteran politician S.Arjun Singh Josh.

Constituency
Josh represents the Sham Chaurasi Assembly Constituency of Punjab and is a three term Member of the Punjab Legislative Assembly.

Political Party  

She joined Bharatiya Janata Party on 4 June 2022 along with Raj Kumar Verka, Gurpreet Singh Kangar, Sundar Sham Arora, and others at the party office in Chandigarh.

Controversy
Josh's nephew Ravi Sher Singh, was booked for culpable homicide and attempt to murder for mowing down two girls and injuring another with his vehicle.

References

External links
 PUNJAB LEGISLATIVE ASSEMBLY
  Chief Parliamentary Secretaries

People from Punjab, India
Shiromani Akali Dal politicians
Living people
Year of birth missing (living people)
Bharatiya Janata Party politicians from Punjab